Donald Wayne Alley (born April 21, 1945) is a former professional American football wide receiver and linebacker in the National Football League.

External links
NFL.com profile

1945 births
Living people
Sportspeople from Cheyenne, Wyoming
Players of American football from Wyoming
American football linebackers
American football wide receivers
Adams State Grizzlies football players
Baltimore Colts players
Pittsburgh Steelers players